Yentl en de Boer is a Dutch cabaret and musical duo, consisting of Yentl Schieman and Christine de Boer. The duo received two Annie M.G. Schmidt Awards, awarded to the best theatrical song of the year: In 2014 for their song Ik heb een man gekend (I knew this guy) and in 2020 for Het is begonnen (It has begun). Earlier on in their career Yentl en de Boer were awarded with the Wim Sonneveld Award and the Audience Award during the Amsterdam Cabaret Festival 2013 (Amsterdams Kleinkunst Festival 2013). Yentl en de Boer are praised for their harmonious vocals and witty lyrics.

Theatre
2010: Kom je op ons partijtje?
2012: Club Silenzio
2013: De Mensen
2013: Club Silenzio in SPACE
2014: Club Silenzio: The Final Quest
2014/2015: De Meisjes
2015-2017: De snoepwinkel is gesloten
2017/2018: Yentl en de Boer in Concert
2018-2019: Magie
2020-2022: De Kampvuursessies
2022-2023: Modderkruipers

Awards
2012: Fringe Silver Award for Club Silenzio during the Amsterdam Fringe Festival
2013: Jury Award (Wim Sonneveld Award) and Audience Award for De Mensen during the Amsterdam Cabaret Festival
2015: Annie M.G. Schmidt Award 2014 for the lyrics, composition and performance of the song Ik heb een man gekend
2021: Annie M.G. Schmidt Award 2020 for the lyrics, composition and performance of the song Het is begonnen

Albums 
 2014: De Plaat (album)
 2015: Ik heb een man gekend (single)
 2016: M'n snoep: Live in Het Concertgebouw (album)
 2018: Morph
 2021: Yentl en de Boer de Serie (Music from the Original TV Series) (soundtrackalbum)
 2022: De Kampvuursessies Live (album)

See also
Music of the Netherlands

References

External links
Official site of Yentl en de Boer (Dutch)

Musical groups from Amsterdam
Dutch cabaret performers
Dutch comedy musicians
Dutch comedy duos
Dutch singer-songwriters
21st-century Dutch singers
Dutch musical duos
Female musical duos